Thomas Aspinwall may refer to:

 Thomas Aspinwall (consul) (1786–1876), American consul
 Thomas Aspinwall (trade unionist) (1846–1901), English trade unionist

See also 
 Thomas Aspinwall Davis (1798–1845), American businessman and mayor of Boston